Saccharomyces uvarum is a species of yeast that is commonly found in fermented beverages, particularly those fermented at colder temperatures. It was originally described by Martinus Willem Beijerinck in 1898, but was long considered identical to S. bayanus. In 2000 and 2005, genetic investigations of various Saccharomyces species indicated that S. uvarum is genetically distinct from S. bayanus and should be considered a unique species.

It is a bottom-fermenting yeast, so-called because it does not form the foam on top of the wort that top-fermenting yeast does.

References

uvarum
Yeasts
Yeasts used in brewing